Moshe Gil (February 8, 1921 – January 23, 2014) was an Israeli historian.

Academic career
Moshe Gil specialized in the historical interaction between Islam and the Jews, including the history of Palestine under the Islamic domination, the institution of the Exilarchate, and Jewish merchants such as the Radhanites. Gil was professor emeritus of the Chaim Rosenberg School of Jewish Studies at Tel Aviv University and held the Joseph and Ceil Mazer Chair in the History of the Jews in Muslim Lands.

Awards
In 1998, Gil was awarded the Israel Prize, for Land of Israel studies,
primarily for his work analyzing some 846 document fragments from the Cairo Genizah and for his work in documenting the role of Jewish merchants in the development of medieval society.

Published works
(1997) "The Babylonian Encounter and the Exilarchic House in the Light of Cairo Geniza Documents and Parallel Arab Sources." (Conference Paper in Proceedings: Judaeo-Arabic studies proceedings of the Founding Conference of the Society for Judaeo Arabic Studies.)
(1995) "The Exilarchate." (Conference Paper in Proceedings : The Jews of medieval Islam: Community, society, and identity: proceedings of an international conference held by the Institute of Jewish Studies, University College London, 1992 )
(1992) A history of Palestine, 634-1099. Cambridge and New York: Cambridge University Press.
(1987) "The Medinan Opposition to the Prophet". (Journal Article in Jerusalem Studies in Arabic and Islam.)
(1987) Review of "Khazarian Hebrew Documents of the Tenth Century" by Golb and Pritsak (Book Review in Journal of Near Eastern studies.)
(1984) "The Origin of the Jews of Yathrib." (Journal Article in Jerusalem studies in Arabic and Islam.)
(1976) Documents of the Jewish pious foundations from the Cairo Geniza. Leiden: Brill. (Book, Edited, Vol. 12 in a series/set )
(1974) "The Radhanite Merchants and the Land of Radhanite." (Journal Article in Journal of the economic and social history of the Orient.)
(1974) "The Constitution of Medina: A Reconsideration" (Journal Article in Israel oriental studies.)

See also
List of Israel Prize recipients

References

1921 births
2014 deaths
Polish emigrants to Israel
Israel Prize in history recipients
Israel Prize in Land of Israel studies recipients
Israeli historians
Jewish historians
Academic staff of Tel Aviv University
Israeli medievalists